Nitride fluorides containing nitride and fluoride ions with the formula NF4-. They can be electronically equivalent to a pair of oxide ions O24-. Nitride fluorides were discovered in 1996 by Lavalle et al. They heated diammonium technetium hexafluoride to 300 °C to yield TcNF. Another preparation is to heat a fluoride compound with a nitride compound in a solid state reaction. The fluorimido ion is F-N2- and is found in a rhenium compound.

References 

Nitrides
Fluorides
Mixed anion compounds